Amelia Thripura Henderson (born 20 October 1995) is a Malaysian actress, television presenter, YouTuber and model.

Early life
Amelia Thripura Henderson was born in Klang, Selangor, Malaysia, and she is the daughter of a Malaysian Indian dentist mother of Ceylonese descent, Dr. Jaya Rudralingam and a Scottish architect father, Graham L. Henderson. She has a younger brother named Alexander Rudrakeith Henderson. Henderson is a Malaysian-British dual national as she attained British citizenship from her father through birth. Henderson is a member of Mensa International, with a certified IQ of 180.

Personal life

Henderson wed a member of the Kedah royal family, Tunku Dato' Harrunnarasheed Putra Tunku Annuar in 2015. Following the wedding, Henderson was conferred official mention as "Yang Mulia Datin Che Puan Amelia Thripura Henderson". Unfortunately, the couple divorced after 3 years of marriage in 2018.

Filmography

Film

Feature films

Direct-to-video

Television films

Television series

Television

Music video

Awards and nominations

References

External links
 
 

1995 births
Living people
Malaysian film actresses
Malaysian television actresses
Malaysian child actresses
People from Selangor
Malaysian people of Indian descent
Malaysian people of Sri Lankan Tamil descent
Malaysian people of Scottish descent
Malaysian people of British descent
Mensans